Ghar Jamai is a 1992 Indian Hindi-language film directed by Arun Bhatt, starring Mithun Chakraborty, Varsha Usgaonkar, Reeta Bhaduri, Vikram Gokhale, Kadar Khan, Amita Nangia and Prem Chopra. The movie is a remake of old Hindi movie Sasural.

Cast

Mithun Chakraborty as Anil
Varsha Usgaonkar
Rita Bhaduri
Vikram Gokhale
Amita Nangia
Prem Chopra
Shammi (actress)
Shakti Kapoor as Ramesh
Kader Khan as Pyaray Lal
Anjan Srivastav
Sushmita Mukherjee
Beena Banerjee

Soundtrack

External links
 
Full Cast

1992 films
1990s Hindi-language films
Films scored by Anand–Milind